Baard Arne Owe (3 July 1936, Mosjøen, Norway – 11 November 2017, aged 81, Copenhagen, Denmark), sometimes credited Bård Owe, was a Norwegian-born Danish actor who has acted in many Scandinavian films and TV series. He moved to Denmark in 1956, and there he lived and worked right up to his death.

Owe is mostly known for his role as pathologist Dr. Bondo in the TV series Riget (The Kingdom), directed by Lars von Trier, as well as for his portrayal of Gertrud's young, manipulative lover in Carl Theodor Dreyer's last film, Gertrud (1964). In his later years Owe made somewhat of a comeback in his native Norway, most notably when in 2007 he starred in the internationally acclaimed movie O'Horten.

Inventor
In addition, Owe invented ToDo, which is a training system for actors. Owe used anatomical, neurological and psychological techniques from mensendik and kung fu to teach actors how to access their inner source of expression.

Personal life & death
Owe was married to actress Marie-Louise Coninck, by whom he had three children.

Owe died of lung cancer at his home aged 81 on 11 November 2017.

Filmography
Jetpiloter (1961)
Gøngehøvdingen (1961)
Den hvide hingst (1961)
Sikken familie (1963)
Hvis lille pige er du ? (1963)
Gertrud (1964)
Gys og gæve tanter (1966)
Krybskytterne på Næsbygård (1966)
Søskende (1966)
Brødrene på Uglegården (1967)
Smukke Arne og Rosa (1967)
Det var en lørdag aften (1968)
Christa (1970)
Sønnen fra Vingården (1975)
Violer er blå (1975)
Strømer (1976)
Brand-Børge rykker ud (1976)
Forræderne (1983)
Suzanne og Leonard (1984)
Notater om kærligheden (1989)
Europa (1991)
Drengene fra Sankt Petri (1991)
Sort høst (1993)
Riget I (1994)
To mand i en sofa (1994)
Portland (1996)
Ørnens øje (1997)
Riget II (1997)
Dykkerne (2000)
Hotellet (2000–2002)
Charlie Butterfly (2002)
Wallander - Mörkret (2005)
Andre Omgang (2007)
O' Horten (2007)
Wallander - Cellisten (2009)
Hodejegerne (2011)
Copenhagen (2014)
Good Favour (2017)

References

External links

1936 births
2017 deaths
Norwegian male film actors
Danish male film actors
Deaths from lung cancer
Deaths from cancer in Denmark
People from Vefsn
Norwegian emigrants to Denmark
Norwegian inventors